Alexandra Stepanova (born 1995) is a Russian ice dancer.

Alexandra or Aleksandra Stepanova may also refer to:
 Aleksandra Stepanova (handballer) (born 1989), Russian handball player
 Alexandra Stepanova (weightlifter) (born 1991), Lithuanian weightlifter